Julia Lier (born 11 November 1991) is a German rower. She competed at the 2014 World Rowing Championships in Amsterdam winning a gold medal.

Career
Before the 2016 Summer Olympics in Rio de Janeiro Solja posed together with swimmer Isabelle Härle, cyclist Nadja Pries, table tennis player Petrissa Solja, and not starting from injury reasons in Rio pole vaulter Katharina Bauer for the German edition of Playboy. In Rio, she won the gold medal.

References

External links
 

1991 births
Living people
People from Ludwigsfelde
German female rowers
Sportspeople from Brandenburg
Olympic rowers of Germany
World Rowing Championships medalists for Germany
Olympic gold medalists for Germany
Rowers at the 2016 Summer Olympics
Olympic medalists in rowing
Medalists at the 2016 Summer Olympics
2010s Playboy Playmates
20th-century German women
21st-century German women